The Joint Admissions and Matriculation Board (JAMB) is a Nigerian entrance examination board for tertiary-level institutions. The board conducts entrance Unified Tertiary Matriculation Examination for prospective undergraduates into Nigerian universities. The board is also charged with the responsibility to administer similar examinations for applicants to Nigerian public and private monotechnics, polytechnics, and colleges of educations. All of these candidates must have obtained the West Africa Senior School Certificate (WASSCE) conducted yearly by the West African Examinations Council, WAEC, or its equivalent, National Examination Council (Nigeria), Senior School Certificate Examination, NECO SSCE.

The pioneer registrar was Michael Saidu Angulu, who served from inception in 1978 until 1986. The current registrar of JAMB is Prof Ishaq Oloyede, who was appointed by President Muhammadu Buhari in August 2016.
Jamb 2023 registration has commenced on 14th of January, 2023 and scheduled to close 14th of February, 2023.

CBT centres 

Jamb CBT (Computer Based Test) Centres are the various locations and centres in Nigeria approved by JAMB for the registration of the UTME examination. There are various JAMB CBT centers/locations in the 36 states in Nigeria including the Federal Capital Territory (Nigeria), FCT.

Examinations 

Every year, the Joint Admission and Matriculation Board conducts one of the most credible examinations in Nigeria that determines whether a student will be admitted to a tertiary institution of learning. A record number of more than 1.7 million candidates registered for the 2022 examination.

The Unified Tertiary Matriculation Examination is only valid for a year with score range 0–400. The examination is a test of knowledge, speed and accuracy. It consists of 180 questions with a time frame of 2 hours (120 minutes). The subject combination vary based on a candidate's desired course of study, although English language is compulsory for all candidates.

The examination is conducted for international candidates who wish to be admitted into any Nigerian Tertiary institution by the West African Examination Council (WAEC).

After the conduct of the year's examination, the board sits and deliberates on the cut-off mark for universities, polytechnics, colleges of education and monotechnics, often universities have the highest cut-off mark, while other institutions require lower marks.

Practice Platforms 

The Joint Admission and Matriculation Board is yet to officially approve a certified CBT practice platform for candidates. However, with growing concern over the performance of candidates in these Computer Based Tests, considering the fact that Nigeria is a developing country with a sizeable number of school children having little to no access to computers & the internet, a number of independent contributors  have provided practice platforms with thousands of past questions to help candidates prepare and boost their performance in the actual test.

Leadership 
Kenneth Victor, Former Registrar
Ishaq Oloyede, Current registrar

References

External links 
 Official website
 JAMB Brochure and Syllabus
 JAMB Result Checker

Education in Nigeria
Organizations established in 1978
1978 establishments in Nigeria